Picibanil also called OK - 432, is a mixture of group A streptococcus with anti-neoplastic properties used in treatment of cystic hygroma (lymphangiomas).

References

Bibliography 

 
 
 
 
 
 
 
 

Streptococcaceae
Antineoplastic drugs